George Lucas (born 1944) is an American film director.

George Lucas may also refer to:
George A. Lucas (1824–1909), American-born art dealer living in Paris
George W. Lucas (1845–1921), American soldier and Medal of Honor recipient
George Lucas, 1st Baron Lucas of Chilworth (1896–1967), British businessman and Labour politician
George Lucas (footballer, born 1901) (1901–1995), Australian rules footballer for St Kilda
George Lucas (footballer, born 1920) (1920–1969), Australian rules footballer for South Melbourne
George Joseph Lucas (born 1949), American archbishop of the Catholic Archdiocese of Omaha
George R. Lucas Jr. (born 1949), American philosopher 
George Lucas, a character in Edwin Arlington Robinson play Van Zorn
George Lucas (footballer, born 1984), Brazilian footballer

See also
George Lucas Hartsuff (1830–1874), American Civil War general
György Lukács (1885–1971), Hungarian philosopher
György Lukács (politician) (1865–1950), Hungarian politician
Jorge Lucas (born 1963), Uruguayan comic book illustrator
Loucas George or Lucas George, American television director and producer